Terence William "Terry" Walker (born 26 October 1935) is a British Labour Party politician.

Early life
Walker was the son of William Edwin and Lilian Grace Walker. Educated at the Grammar School and College of Further Education in Bristol, he became an accountant, and worked for Courage (Western) Limited from 1951 to 1974.

Political career 
Walker was the Member of Parliament (MP) for the then-new constituency of Kingswood from 1974 to 1979 when he lost the seat to the Conservative Jack Aspinwall by just 303 votes (0.6%). He contested Kingswood again at the subsequent 1983 election, but failed to retake the seat. In 1987, he unsuccessfully stood for Bristol North West.

He became a member of Avon County Council in 1981 until its abolition in 1996; he was Vice-Chairman, 1992–93 and Chairman, 1993–94. From then, until his retirement in 2015, he was a member of South Gloucestershire Council, representing Kings Chase ward. During his tenure, he was Deputy Leader of the Labour Group from 1996 to 2009. From 1996 to 2015, Walker was also Chairman of the Avon Fire Authority.

Personal life
In 1959, Walker married Priscilla Dart; the marriage was dissolved in 1983. They have a daughter and two sons. In 1983, Walker married Rosalie Fripp. His daughter-in-law, Julie Walker, was formerly also a South Gloucestershire councillor, both representing the same ward.

References

Times Guide to the House of Commons October 1974

South Gloucestershire Council member's information.
Bristol Evening Post, 4 May 2007.

External links 
 

1935 births
Living people
Labour Party (UK) MPs for English constituencies
UK MPs 1974
UK MPs 1974–1979
Councillors in Gloucestershire
Church Estates Commissioners